Best Hit AKG 2 (2012–2018) is the second best-of album by Japanese rock band Asian Kung-Fu Generation. It was released on March 28, 2018, alongside two compilation album, Best Hit AKG Official Bootleg "HONE" and "IMO". Best Hit AKG 2 contain songs and all singles from 2012–2018 (except "Kouya wo Aruke) and new song, "Seija no March". HONE and IMO are playlist created by Masafumi Gotoh around Best Hit AKG released. HONE has a selection of heavier tracks, whilst IMO version is a mix of “power pop” themed songs. Artwork for both album drawn by Gotoh and based The Beatles's red and blue album.

Track listing

HONE and IMO track listing

Chart

References

Asian Kung-Fu Generation albums
2018 compilation albums
Japanese-language compilation albums
Sony Music compilation albums